Sam Gilbert may refer to:
 Sam Gilbert (Australian footballer) (born 1986), Australian rules footballer
 Sam Gilbert (businessman) (1913–1987), American businessman and UCLA Athletic promoter
 Sam Gilbert (rugby union) (born 1999), New Zealand rugby union player

See also
 Samuel Gilbert (died 1692), English cleric and writer on floriculture
 Sam G. Bratton (Samuel Gilbert Bratton, 1888–1963), American senator and judge